Copăceni is a commune located in Vâlcea County, Oltenia, Romania. It is composed of six villages: Bălteni, Bondoci, Copăceni, Hotărasa, Ulmetu (the commune centre) and Vețelu.

References

Communes in Vâlcea County
Localities in Oltenia